Shardul-class landing ships are large amphibious warfare vessels built at Garden Reach Shipbuilders and Engineers for the Indian Navy. They are an evolution of the  amphibious landing ships.

The class has an indigenous content of over 90%.

History
Shardul was the first vessel commissioned at Karwar Naval Base, INS Kadamba. The second ship Kesari was commissioned at the Visakhapatnam Naval Base, and later moved to Port Blair. The third ship Airavata underwent sea trials in 2008 and was commissioned in 2009.

Ships

See also
List of active Indian Navy ships

References

External links

Shardul Class - Bharat Rakshak
Launch of INS Kesari
Shardul handed over to Navy
GRSE hands over Shardul to Indian Navy

 
Amphibious warfare vessel classes
Ships built in India